Jiao Tong University is an interchange station between Line 10 and Line 11 of the Shanghai Metro. The station entered operation on 10 April 2010 with the operations of Line 10. It became an interchange station with Line 11 on 31 August 2013.

The famous Shanghai Jiao Tong University is located near the station, thus giving the station its name.

Station Layout

Places nearby
 Shanghai Jiao Tong University

References

Railway stations in Shanghai
Shanghai Metro stations in Changning District
Shanghai Metro stations in Xuhui District
Railway stations in China opened in 2010
Line 10, Shanghai Metro
Line 11, Shanghai Metro